Robert Holden may refer to:

 Robert Holden (landscape architect), British landscape architect
 Robert Holden (author) (born 1964), psychologist, author, and broadcaster
 Bob Holden (born 1949), American politician
 Bob Holden (racing driver) (born 1932), Australian racing driver
 Bob Holden, character in Aloma of the South Seas (1926 film)
 Robert Holden (motorcyclist) (1958–1996), motorcycle road racer from New Zealand
 Robert Holden (photographer), American photographer
 Robert Holden (politician) (born 1950 or 1951), American graphic designer and politician
 Rob Holden (born 1956), British accountant